Subway Night is an album by jazz hornist David Amram, released in 1972 on RCA Records.

Track listing
"Fabulous Fifties"
"Little Momma"
"Credo"
"Subway Night"
"Professor and the Panhandler"
"Horn and Hardart Succotash Blues"
"Neon Casbah"
"East and West"
"Ballad for Red Allen"
"Message to the Politicians of the World"
"Mean Dean"

Personnel
David Amram - piano, vocals, guitar, flute
Macdougal Street Composers - choir, chorus
Irwin Markowitz - trumpet
Tony Miranda - French horn
Jack O'Hara - guitar
Randy Peyton Quartet - choir, chorus
Henry Schuman - oboe
Midhat Serbagi - viola
Brooks Tillotson - French horn
Wilmer Wise - trumpet
Andy Statman - mandolin
Al Harewood - drums
William Arrowsmith - English horn
Souren Baronian - clarinet
Dick Baxter - engineer
Sam T. Brown - guitar
James Buffington - French horn
Herb Bushler - bass
Don Butterfield - tuba
Earl Chapin - French horn
Jane Cochran - oboe
Kenny Kosek - violin
Marvin Feinsmith - bassoon
Charles Ganimian -
Ali Candido Hafid - bongos, congas
David Bromberg - electric guitar
Pepper Adams - baritone saxophone
Joe Beck - electric guitar
Joe Henderson - tenor saxophone
Bobby Jones - tenor saxophone, clarinet
Thad Jones - trumpet
George Mgrdichian -
Collin Walcott - tabla
Bill Watrous - trombone
Joe Wilder - trumpet

References

1972 albums
David Amram albums
RCA Records albums